Thomas Scrope may refer to:
 Thomas Scrope, 5th Baron Scrope of Masham (1429–1475)
 Thomas Scrope, 10th Baron Scrope of Bolton (1567–1609)
 Thomas Scrope (1723-1792), Member of Parliament (MP) for Lincoln 1768–1774
 Thomas Scrope (d. 1491/2), or (de) Bradley, English bishop; Bishop of Dromore and Assistant Bishop of Norwich